The women's triple jump at the 2012 IAAF World Indoor Championships took place March 9 and 10 at the Ataköy Athletics Arena.

Ageless wonder 39-year-old Yamilé Aldama improved upon her already pending W35 World Record in qualifying.  In the second attempt of the finals, she exceeded the existing record by 31 cm, which also proved to good enough for the win.  While this competition is indoors, since 2000 IAAF rules allow for indoor records to count for overall (outdoor) records.

Medalists

Records

Qualification standards

Schedule

Results

Qualification

Qualification standard 14.30 m (Q) or at least best 8 qualified.  30 athletes from 20 countries participated.  The qualification round started at 09:32 and ended at 10:20.

Final

8 athletes from 7 countries participated.  The final started at 17:06 and ended at 18:10.

References

Triple Jump
Triple jump at the World Athletics Indoor Championships
2012 in women's athletics